The Hunde people also (Bahunde, Kobi, Rukobi) are descendants of Bantu people primarily inhabiting the Kivu region of the Democratic Republic of the Congo. Many live in the Masisi, Rutshuru and Walikale territories. Some Bahunde also live in Rwanda and southwestern Uganda. They number approximately 950,000 and speak the Hunde language.

The Bahunde or Hunde claim to have come from north during the Bantu migration from Egypt. They first settled in Uganda and became part of the Toro Kingdom then later migrated to the DRCongo a few centuries later and created the Kingdom of the Bahunde. They are a monotheistic people that, practice male circumcision as their tradition and believe in Ongo; one supreme God. Non-bantoid Neighbouring tribes often refer to them as descendants of the lost tribes of the biblical Israelites because of their culture, custom, music and language, the Bahunde are also a warrior tribe (see Mai-Mai) and enjoy traditional dance and music of praise, they are mainly farmers and small cattle-keepers.

Among the massive capture of Bantu speaking people, many of the Bahunde were captured and sold during the Arab slavery of Africans, many more were also captured by the Portuguese and shipped during the trans Atlantic slavery, and with the coming of the European coloniser, the Bahunde Kingdom was reduced to chiefdoms and forced to convert to Christianity and Islam after a decade of resistance and resilience. The Bahunde have been in conflict with the Banyarwanda of Rwanda many times long before independence, in particular with the Tutsi; a Nilotic-Hamitic tribe in Rwanda, Burundi and Uganda, many Bantu kingdoms in this region  fought with these tall, skinny giants as they see them as being descendants of the Hamito-Egyptians.

References 

Ethnic groups in the Democratic Republic of the Congo
Ethnic groups in Uganda
Ethnic groups in Rwanda

4.  THE BAHUNDE OF MASISI TERRITOIRE ( Field Notes (1957) and a Brief Overview of Existing Literature by  Daniel P. Biebuyck.

5. Bantu Habiru, Kabiru ( Redefining Bantu people ) Yaounde,